Yun Ju-tae is a South Korean professional footballer who plays for Gyeongnam FC as a striker.

Career
After attending Yonsei University, Yun signed for German club FSV Frankfurt in May 2011, making his professional debut in the 2011–12 season. He later played for SV Sandhausen and FC Seoul. He made his debut for FC Seoul on 19 March 2014, in their AFC Champions League match against Japanese club Sanfrecce Hiroshima.

He joined Sangju Sangmu to serve his military duty after the 2016 season ends.

Career statistics

References

External links 
 

1990 births
Living people
South Korean footballers
FSV Frankfurt players
SV Sandhausen players
FC Seoul players
Gimcheon Sangmu FC players
Gyeongnam FC players
2. Bundesliga players
K League 1 players
K League 2 players
Association football forwards
South Korean expatriate footballers
Expatriate footballers in Germany
South Korean expatriate sportspeople in Germany
Yonsei University alumni
People from Yangsan
Sportspeople from South Gyeongsang Province